The Panther Woman is a 1918 American drama film directed by Ralph Ince and starring Olga Petrova. It was written by Mary Murillo based upon the 1895 novel Patience Sparhawk and Her Times by Gertrude Atherton and released in October 1918 by First National.

Plot
As described in a film magazine, Patience Sparhawk (Petrova) is an orphan who has been reared by a dissolute stepmother. An inheritance of good character, however, has kept her from being contaminated and when she gets the opportunity to break away and become the ward of Miss Tremont, a wealthy woman, she does so. Out of gratitude she agrees to marry Tremont's nephew, Beverly Peale (Steele). Soon after the ceremony she discovers that her husband is a user of drugs and her married life is unhappy. It ends abruptly when Beverly is found dead from an overdose of drugs. Patience is accused of murder and put on trial. She is defended by noted criminal lawyer Garon Bourke (Fellowes), who is in love with her and whom Patience loves. Despite Garon's strenuous efforts, his client is convicted and sentenced to die in the electric chair. The evidence of Honora Maris (Reed), who was enamored of Beverly, was the deciding factor. The day of the scheduled execution arrives and at the eleventh hour Garon obtains a confession from Miss Maris that she committed perjury on the witness stand. Garon makes a desperate race to the prison with a reprieve and saves Patience just as she was in the electric chair and the executioner was preparing to throw the switch.

Cast
Olga Petrova as Patience Sparhawk
Rockliffe Fellowes as Garon Bourke
Vernon Steele as Beverly Peale
Mathilde Baring as Mrs. Peale
Gene Burnell as Hal
Frederick Truesdell as Beverly's Father
Tefft Johnson as Governor of New York
Violet Reed as Honora Maris
James A. Furey as 'Old Foord' (credited as James Furey)
Norma Seifert as Mrs. Sparhawk
Harry Lambart as Latimer Burr (credited as Harry Lambert)
Edwin J. Grant (Undetermined Role)

Preservation status
This film is now a lost silent feature.

Reception
Like many American films of the time, The Panther Woman was subject to cuts by city and state film censorship boards. For example, the Chicago Board of Censors required a cut, in Reel 6, of the testing of the electric chair.

References

External links

 
 Atherton, Gertrude, Patience Sparhawk and Her Times, a Novel, New York: R. F. Fenno & Co., 1903 edition, on the Internet Archive

1918 films
American silent feature films
Films directed by Ralph Ince
1918 drama films
American black-and-white films
Lost American films
Silent American drama films
Films based on works by Gertrude Atherton
1918 lost films
Lost drama films
1910s American films